Nevada state law allows for governance of unincorporated towns under two different systems. The Unincorporated government Law, adopted in 1975, applies to counties of 100,000 people or more, and any other county that opts in. For other counties, a patchwork system of laws applies.

A 1975 study by the state Legislative Commission identified 39 unincorporated towns in Nevada. As of 2014, the state Demographer's Office listed 44 unincorporated towns.

Unincorporated Town Government Law
The Unincorporated Town Government Law, adopted in 1975, applies to counties with a population over 100,000 (Clark and Washoe Counties), and any other county whose commissioners pass an ordinance adopting the law.

Under this law, unincorporated towns are provided extra services by the county, paid for by property taxes or other revenue sources from the town. A town can be formed by an initiative petition by residents, or by the county commissioners.

A town advisory board is impaneled for each town. The county commissioners may choose for the town advisory board to be elected by town residents, or appointed by the commissioners. In either case, the commissioners may remove a board member at any time.

The advisory board is responsible for acting as a liaison between the residents and the county commissioners, and advising the commissioners on budgets and local ordinances. The commissioners may delegate to the advisory board management of local services and expenditures.

Other counties
In counties where the Unincorporated Town Government Law does not apply, a town board may be established for an unincorporated town, either by initiative petition or act of the county commissioners. The five-member board is elected by residents.

The county commission may levy a property tax of up to 1.5% on all property in the town. This tax, and other town revenue, is placed in a town fund administered by the county, to be used only for the benefit of the town.

Many town government functions can be exercised jointly by the town board or the county commissioners, such as providing local services, adopting ordinances, regulating businesses, establishing police and fire departments, and issuing bonds

As an alternative to a town board, county commissioners may create a citizens' advisory council for an unincorporated town. The three-to-five-member council is appointed by commissioners after an "informal election".  The council acts in an advisory and liaison capacity, and does not affect the responsibilities of the commissioners.

The option to establish a town board was enacted in 1967. The system was unpopular, because of an impractical provision that required two county commissioners to sit on the town board; by 1975, it had been adopted by only one town, Crescent Valley. The citizens' advisory council provision was passed into law in 1973. The town board law was later amended in 1985 to remove the requirement of county commissioners serving on the board.

Notes 

 
Nevada law
Local government in Nevada